The 2020 Alberta Boston Pizza Cup presented by Best Western, the provincial men's curling championship for Alberta, was held from February 5 to 9 at the Westlock Curling Club in Westlock, Alberta. The winning Brendan Bottcher rink represented Alberta at the 2020 Tim Hortons Brier in Kingston, Ontario.

In an all Saville Community SC final, Brendan Bottcher defeated Karsten Sturmay 7–6 with a draw to the button in the tenth end to win his third provincial title.

Qualification

Teams
The teams are listed as follows:

Round-robin standings
Final round-robin standings

Round-robin results
All draws are listed in Mountain Time (UTC−07:00).

Draw 1
Wednesday, February 5, 12:00 pm

Draw 2
Wednesday, February 5, 6:30 pm

Draw 3
Thursday, February 6, 9:30 am

Draw 4
Thursday, February 6, 2:30 pm

Draw 5
Thursday, February 6, 6:30 pm

Draw 6
Friday, February 7, 9:30 am

Draw 7
Friday, February 7, 2:30 pm

Draw 8
Friday, February 7, 6:30 pm

Playoffs

A2 vs. B2
Saturday, February 8, 2:00 pm

A1 vs. B1
Saturday, February 8, 6:30 pm

Semifinal
Sunday, February 9, 10:30 am

Final
Sunday, February 9, 4:30 pm

References

External links

Curling in Alberta
2020 Tim Hortons Brier
Westlock County
2020 in Alberta
Boston Pizza Cup